The Controller and Auditor-General (the Auditor-General) is an Officer of the New Zealand Parliament responsible for auditing public bodies. John Ryan began his seven-year term as Controller and Auditor-General on 2 July 2018. The Deputy Controller and Auditor-General is Greg Schollum. Their mandate and responsibilities are set out in the Public Audit Act 2001. They are appointed by the Governor-General on the recommendation of the House of Representatives.

Role and functions
Public entities are accountable to Parliament and the public for their use of public resources and powers conferred by Parliament. The Auditor-General provides independent assurance that public entities are operating, and accounting for their performance, in keeping with Parliament's intentions. The Auditor-General is independent of executive government and Parliament in discharging the functions of the statutory office, but is answerable to Parliament for stewardship of the public resources entrusted to her.

Under the Public Audit Act 2001, the Auditor-General is the auditor of all public entities, including:
 the Crown
 government departments
 Crown entities (such as the Commerce Commission, the New Zealand Transport Agency, and Te Papa)
 State-owned enterprises (such as New Zealand Post, Kiwibank, and the Meteorological Service of New Zealand)
 local authorities and their subsidiaries (for example, local councils, ports, and airports)
 district health boards
 tertiary education institutions (universities, polytechs, and wānanga)
 schools
 statutory boards
 other public bodies

The Auditor-General employs the public sector organisation Audit New Zealand and contracts with private sector accounting firms to carry out these annual audits.

As well as annual audits, the Auditor-General carries out performance audits and inquiries. Other work of the Auditor-General includes: 
 advice to Parliament
 advice and liaison
 working with the accounting and auditing profession
 international liaison and involvement.

The organisation's structure
The Auditor-General employs staff in two business units – the Office of the Auditor-General and Audit New Zealand – and contracts with private sector accounting firms. The two business units share a Corporate Services Team.

Office of the Auditor-General 
The Office of the Auditor-General carries out strategic audit planning, sets policy and standards, appoints auditors and oversees their performance, carries out performance audits, provides reporting and advice to Parliament, and carries out inquiries and other special studies.

Audit New Zealand 
Audit New Zealand carries out annual audits allocated by the Auditor-General. It also provides other assurance services to public entities, within the Auditor-General’s mandate and in keeping with the Auditor-General’s Auditing Standard on the independence of auditors.

Audit New Zealand's auditors examine the financial statements of public entities and handle special governance, risk, and contract and project management assignments. Audit New Zealand has specialist Tax Audit and Information Systems Assurance Audit teams.

International liaison and involvement
The Auditor-General is currently the Secretary General of the Pacific Association of Supreme Audit Institutions (PASAI). PASAI is the official association of Supreme Audit Institutions (government Audit Offices and similar organisations, known as SAIs) in the Pacific. PASAI is one of the regional working groups belonging to the International Organisation of Supreme Audit Institutions (INTOSAI).

The Auditor-General is a member of INTOSAI, and also contributes to the international auditing community by accepting requests to host delegations from overseas audit offices and other government bodies.

Auditors-General of New Zealand
The first Auditor-General took office in 1846, and before that audit functions were carried out in the Colonial Secretary’s Office. From 1 January 1842 until the appointment of Dr Knight in 1846, accounts were certified by a board consisting of three Commissioners of Audit. The 20th (and current) Auditor-General John Ryan took office on 2 July 2018.
 1846–1878 Charles Knight MD, FRCS: 1846–1878 Auditor-General; 1872–1878 Joint Commissioner of Audit
 1867–1878 James FitzGerald CMG, BA (Cambridge): 1867–1878 Comptroller of the Public Account; 1872–1878 Joint Commissioner of Audit; 1878–1896 Controller and Auditor-General
 1896–1910 James Kemmis Warburton
 1910–1922 Robert Joseph Collins
 1922–1937 George Frederick Colin Campbell CMG
 1937–1939 James Henry Fowler
 1939–1945 Cyril George Collins CMG
 1945–1952 John Porteous Rutherford CBE
 1952–1960 Christopher Robert John Atkin CBE
 1960–1965 Archibald Douglas Burns CBE 
 1965–1970 Bernard David Arthur Greig CBE      
 1970–1975 Keith Gillies CBE 
 1975–1983 Alfred Charles Shailes CMG 
 1983–1992 Brian Henry Charles Tyler CBE	
 1992–1994 Jeffrey Thomas Chapman 
 1995–2002 David John Douglas Macdonald QSO 	
 2002–2009 Kevin Brady CNZM
 2009–2017 Lyn Provost CNZM
 2017 Martin Matthews

References

External links
Auditor-General's website
Audit New Zealand's website

New Zealand
New Zealand Public Service departments
Officers of the Parliament of New Zealand